Gustavo Bueno Martínez (1 September 1924 – 7 August 2016) was a Spanish philosopher, founder of a philosophical doctrine dubbed by himself as "philosophical materialism".
 
Pupil of the national-syndicalist Santiago Montero Díaz, Bueno's ideological path reached a blend of right-wing and left-wing totalitarianism during the years of the late francoism.

Biography 
Gustavo Bueno Martínez was born in Santo Domingo de la Calzada on 1 September 1924. He was the son of a Germanophile and the grandson of a Carlist. He began studies of philosophy at the University of Zaragoza, earning his licentiate degree (as well as his PhD degree) from the University of Madrid. From 1949 to 1960, he worked as a philosophy professor (and from 1951 on also as a principal) in the 'Lucía Medrano' female high school, located in Salamanca. Throughout the 1950s, he appears as provincial political commissar of the Movimiento. In 1954, he married noted SEU activist Carmen Sánchez Revilla. In 1960, he left for Oviedo, as he was appointed as a professor of Fundamentals of Philosophy and History of Philosophical Systems at the University of Oviedo.

Philosophical materialism 
Philosophical materialism is a systematic doctrine about the structure of reality, characterized by its opposition to monistic materialism (typical of dialectical materialism) and to monistic idealism or spiritualism of theology. However philosophical materialism is a pluralism of rationalism, that postulates the uniqueness of the world as a development of a general ontological matter that does not reduce to the empirical world. Philosophical materialism denies, against monistic continuity, and in agreement with the principle of the symploké that, "everything has an influence in everything" and denies, against pluralistic atomism that, "nothing has an influence in anything".

With respect to traditional materialism, philosophical materialism has a common characteristic, the denial of spiritualism, and the denial of spiritual essence. But unlike other materialism, philosophical materialism does not reduce materialism to the denial of supernatural things. Philosophical materialism admits the reality of incorporeal things: for example the real relation (not mental) of the distance that exists between two bottles of water that are on a table is as real as two corporeal bottles. This distance is incorporeal material and is not spiritual. With this criterion the concept of matter is redefined for philosophy and shows a more precise word than matter, the stroma. 

This system has several aspects to be described:

 Ontology (general and particular)
 Gnosiology (theory of the categorical closure)
 Philosophy of religion (and the role of animals in the essence of religion)

These were the predominant subjects of the writings of Bueno until the 1990s. However, at the start of the new millennium, he started to deal with ethical subjects and social and political subjects. However, he was criticized that he did not display the same "same rigor." For example, it is said of his criticisms of pacifism that it is more of an attempt to make, "deceitful analysis" of "rhetorical attitude" and they often arrive, "to the insult and unjust disqualification from biased analysis", without ever showing changes of position in his arguments.

Spain and Empire 
A main intellectual reference for the 21st-century vindicators of the Spanish imperial past jointly with Elvira Roca Barea, he espoused the idea of the Asturian kingdom as an embryonic 'Spain' and as a case of Translatio imperii with respect to Rome (bypassing the Visigoths, as they occupied the Iberian Peninsula, but they would have done it so "with the will to remain in seclusion in it"), pursuing the "imperial city" category for Oviedo, underpinning his main thesis of that of the "consubstantiality" of the process of the constitution of 'Spain' as a characteristic entity of Universal History and the process of its conformation as a Universal Empire.

Bibliography
 Sciences as Categorical Closures, 2013
 El papel de la Filosofía en el conjunto del saber (1971)
 Ensayos materialistas (1972)
 Ensayo sobre las Categorías de la Economía Política, (1973)
 La Metafísica Presocrática, (1975)
La Idea de Ciencia desde la Teoría del Cierre Categorial, 1977
Etnología y utopía, 1982
Nosotros y ellos, 1983
El animal divino, 1985
 Cuestiones cuodlibetales sobre Dios y la Religión, (1989)
 Materia, (1990)]
 Primer ensayo sobre las categorías de las Ciencias Políticas, (1991)
Teoría del Cierre Categorial (5 vols.), 1993
 ¿Qué es la filosofía? (1995)
 ¿Qué es la ciencia? (1995)
El Mito de la Cultura: ensayo de una teoría materialista de la cultura, 1997
España frente a Europa, 2000
Telebasura y democracia, 2002
El mito de la izquierda: las izquierdas y la derecha, 2003
La vuelta a la caverna: terrorismo, guerra y globalización, 2004
España no es un mito: claves para una defensa razonada, 2005
Zapatero y el pensamiento Alicia: un presidente en el país de las maravillas, 2006
La fe del ateo, 2007
 El Mito de la derecha, 2008
 Ensayo de una definición filosófica de la Idea de Deporte, 2014
 El Ego trascendental, 2016

Filmography
 2015 – Gustavo Bueno. La vuelta a la caverna (dir. Héctor Muniente) – documentary

References

External links
 Fundación Gustavo Bueno official web page

1924 births
2016 deaths
People from La Rioja
20th-century Spanish philosophers
21st-century Spanish philosophers
Spanish nationalists
Spanish high school teachers
Academic staff of the University of Oviedo